Mission: Impossible is a multimedia franchise based on a fictional secret espionage agency known as the Impossible Missions Force (IMF). The 1966 TV series ran for seven seasons and was revived in 1988 for two seasons. It inspired a series of theatrical motion pictures starring Tom Cruise beginning in 1996. By 2011, the franchise generated over $4 billion in revenue making Mission: Impossible one of the highest-grossing media franchises of all time. As of 2022, the latest item released in the franchise was the action-drama Mission: Impossible – Fallout, which premiered in Paris on July 12, 2018.

Media

Television series

Films

Soundtracks

Video games

Books

Comics

Cast and characters

References

External links
 

 
Mass media franchises introduced in 1966
Television franchises
American spy fiction